Eugene Nester is an American plant microbiologist who has made significant contributions to the field of microbe-host interactions in plants and especially on Agrobacterium species. He has been a member of the National Academy of Sciences since 1994. He is an emeritus professor at the University of Washington.

References

Year of birth missing (living people)
Living people
American microbiologists
Members of the United States National Academy of Sciences
University of Washington faculty
Place of birth missing (living people)
20th-century American biologists
21st-century American biologists